The Tour métallique de Fourvière ("Metallic tower of Fourvière"), a landmark of Lyon, France, is a steel framework tower which bears a striking resemblance to the Eiffel Tower, which predates it by three years. With a height of 85.9 metres (282') and weight of 210 tons, the "metallic tower" was built between 1892 and 1894.

During the Exposition universelle of 1914 in Lyon it had a restaurant and an elevator capable of taking 22 people up to the summit. Although used as an observation tower until November 1, 1953, nowadays it serves as a television tower and is not accessible to the public. At 372 metres (1220'), it is the highest point in Lyon.

Broadcasting stations

FM-radio

TV

See also
 Fourvière
 Lattice tower
 List of towers

External links

 
  La tour métallique de Fourvière à Lyon Extensive documentation and building information
 Skyscraperpage.com

Gallery

5th arrondissement of Lyon
Buildings and structures in Lyon
Towers in France
Transmitter sites in France
1894 establishments in France
Towers completed in 1894